Ballinakill is a small village in County Laois, Ireland on the R432 regional road between Abbeyleix, Ballyragget and Castlecomer, County Kilkenny. As of the 2016 census, there were 445 people living in Ballinakill.

History
From 1613 until the Act of Union, the town was a parliamentary borough, electing two members to the Irish House of Commons.

The town was besieged and plundered by Irish rebels, including the Earl of Castlehaven and Lord Mountgarret, during the 1641 rebellion. When the castle and town surrendered much was robbed, including cattle, sheep and cloth. Remarkably, this information survives to us through an account from a native American Patagonian from present day southern Argentina/Chile 'but now a Christian' who had been a servant to Captain Richard Steele for twenty years and lived in Ballinakill.

Landmarks

The town square features a monument to men who died in the 1798 rebellion. The monument was erected in 1898. In 1998 a ceremony was held in Ballinakill to mark the bicentenary of the deaths.

Heywood House Gardens, located just north of Ballinakill, is a formal garden on the former Heywood Estate which was designed by Edwin Lutyens and Gertrude Jekyll in the early 20th century. The gardens are now managed by the Office of Public Works and open to the public.

Sport
Ballinakill GAA and Spink GAA are local Gaelic Athletic Association clubs.

See also
 List of towns and villages in Ireland

References

Further reading

 Ballinakill: A Journey through Time by Ger Dunphy and Christy O'Shea (2002)

Towns and villages in County Laois
Townlands of County Laois